Chliaria othona, the orchid tit, is a species of lycaenid or blue butterfly found in Asia.

The orchid tit is one of the rare butterflies belonging to the family Lycaenidae (Kehimkar, 2008). This butterfly is fairly common in northern India, but was reported to be very rare in southern India. In India, Chliaria othona is distributed in the Western Ghats, Uttaranchal to Arunachal Pradesh, the northeast, West Bengal and the Andaman Islands. It was also reported from Nepal, Bhutan, Bangladesh and Myanmar. The species prefers wet forests of up to 1524 meters altitude from the mean sea level and occasionally visits damp patches for mud-puddling. The caterpillars of orchid tit feed on the flower buds and flowers of orchids, hence the name.

Subspecies
The subspecies of Chliaria othona are-
 Chliaria othona othona Hewitson, 1865 – India, Myanmar, Thailand
 Chliaria othona mimima Druce, 1895 – Borneo
 Chliaria othona matiana Fruhstorfer, 1912 – Vietnam
 Chliaria othona dendrobia Roepke, 1919 – Java
 Chliaria othona semanga Corbet, 1940 – peninsular Malaya
 Chliaria othona jiwabaruana Eliot, 1980 – Mentawai Island
 Chliaria othona waltraudae (Treadaway & Nuyda, [1995])

Description

Distribution

The orchid tit is found in Bangladesh, India, Myanmar, Thailand, Laos, northern Vietnam, Peninsular Malaysia, Pulau Tioman and possibly Taiwan.

In India the butterfly is found in the Western Ghats, the Himalayas from Garhwal to Assam, Bengal and onto Myanmar.

Status
The species is considered rare in southern India, but not rare in the north.

Habits
The orchid tit is to be found in dense, rainy jungles. It is rarely seen except around its food plants - the flower buds of epiphytic orchids. It flies weakly and settles on flowers, leaves. It visits damp patches.

Life cycle

Caterpillar - green onisciform (woodlouse-shaped) larvae with red dorsal band and three red rippled lines on each side. The caterpillar's head is concealed and its body is covered with minute bristles. Distinct short protuberances extend from the anal segment. It feeds on the flowers of the orchid.

Pupa - smooth and greenish grey, resembles those of other Lycaenidae species. It has a few white markings, with a distinctly wavy pattern on the wing covers. It is found fastened along the stem of the orchids.

Larval food plants - The orchid tit's larval host plants are from the family Orchidaceae from genera Arundina, Dendrobium, Papilionanthe, Phaius, Phalaenopsis, Spathoglottis and the specific species are Papilionanthe subulata and Spathoglottis plicata

See also
Lycaenidae
List of butterflies of India (Lycaenidae)

Cited references

References

External links

Chliaria
Butterflies of Asia
Butterflies described in 1865